In economics, benefit incidence refers to the availability of a benefit. In the United States, the benefit incidence is calculated by the National Compensation Survey (NCS).

See also
 Employee benefit
 Expenditure incidence
 National Compensation Survey
 Fiscal incidence
 Bureau of Labor Statistics

References

External links
 Benefit incidence, U.S. Bureau of Labor Statistics Division of Information Services
 Employee Benefits Survey, U.S. Bureau of Labor Statistics Division of Information Services

Labour economics indices
Employee benefits